List of Engineering Faculties in Egypt:
Faculty of Engineering, Cairo University.
Faculty of Engineering, Ain Shams University.
Faculty of Engineering, Alexandria University.
Faculty of Engineering, Helwan University.
Faculty of Engineering In Mataria, Helwan University.
Faculty of Engineering, Benha University.
Faculty of Engineering In Shobra, Benha University.
Faculty of Electronic Engineering, Menoufia University
Faculty of Engineering, Menoufia University
Faculty of Engineering, Mansoura University
Faculty of Engineering, Tanta University
Faculty of Engineering, Zagazig University
Faculty of Engineering, Suez Canal University
Faculty of Petroleum Engineering and Mining, Suez University
Faculty of Engineering, Assiut University
Faculty of Engineering, Aswan University
Faculty of Energy Engineering, Aswan University
Faculty of Engineering, South Valley University
Faculty of Engineering, Kafr Elsheikh University
Faculty of Engineering, Port Said University
Faculty of Engineering, Sohag University
Faculty of Engineering, Minia University
Faculty of Engineering, Fayoum University
Faculty of Engineering, Beni Suef University
Faculty of Engineering, Damietta University.
Faculty of Engineering, Egypt-Japan University of Science & Technology.
Faculty of Engineering, Egypt University of Informatics
School of Engineering, Nile University
Faculty of Engineering, French University In Egypt
Faculty of Engineering, Galala University
Faculty of Engineering, AlAlamein International University
Faculty of Engineering, King Salman International University
Faculty of Engineering, New Mansoura University
College of Engineering, University of Science and Technology, Zewail City
School of Engineering, The American University In Cairo.
Faculty of Engineering, The German University In Cairo
Faculty of Engineering, The German International University
Faculty of Engineering, The British University In Egypt
College of Engineering, The Arab Academy of Science, Technology & Maritime Transport.
Faculty of Engineering, Hertfordshire University In Egypt
College of Engineering, Misr University For Science & Technology
Faculty of Engineering, Misr International University
Faculty of Engineering, MSA University
Faculty of Engineering, October 6 University
Faculty of Engineering, Pharos University In Alexandria
Faculty of Engineering, Badr University In Cairo
Faculty of Engineering, European Universities In Egypt
Faculty of Engineering, Canadian Universities In Egypt
Faculty of Engineering, Coventry University
Faculty of Engineering, Egyptian Russian University

Egypt education-related lists
Education in Egypt
Egypt